Melon de Bourgogne or Melon is a variety of white grape grown primarily in the Loire Valley region of France.  It is also grown in North America.  It is best known through its use in the white wine Muscadet.

In the U.S., Federal law prevents "Muscadet" from being used for American-produced wine; only the full name of the grape, or the shortened "Melon" can be used.

History
As its name suggests, the grape originated in Burgundy and was grown there until its destruction was ordered in the early 18th century. In the vineyards around Nantes and the western Loire, however, the harsh winter of 1709 destroyed so many vines that a new variety was needed, and the Melon grape was introduced. Since then it has been used solely in the production of the light dry white wine Muscadet, which is made entirely from the Melon grape. The grape is so associated with its appellation that the grape itself is often known as Muscadet. 

DNA analysis has revealed Melon de Bourgogne to be a cross between Pinot blanc and Gouais blanc.

North America

As of 2007, the grape is grown in Oregon. where it is known simply as Melon.  The grape has been introduced into Washington by Perennial Vintners on Bainbridge Island, six miles across Puget Sound from Seattle.  This grape was brought to America in 1939, and was propagated incorrectly as Pinot Blanc in the early 1980s.  For more on this error, see also "Melon de Bourgogne - History" at MelonDeBourgogne.com.

Synonyms 
Melon de Bourgogne is also known under the synonyms Auxerrois Gros, Biaune, Blanc de Nantes, Bourgogne blanche, Bourgogne verde, Bourgogne verte, Bourguignon blanc, Clozier, Feher Nagyburgundi, Feuille Ronde, Gamay blanc, Gamay Blanc à Feuilles Rondes, Gamay Blanc Feuilles Rondes, Game Kruglolistnyi, Gros Auxerrois, Gros blanc, Grosse Saint Marie, Lyonnais, Lyonnaise blanche, Malin blanc, Mele, Melon, Meurlon, Mourlon, Muscadet, Perry, Petit Bourgogne, Petit Muscadet, Petite Biaune, Petoin, Petouin, Picarneau, Plant de Lons-Le-Saulnie, Roussette Basse, Später Weisser Burgunder, and Weisser Burgunder.

References

External links
 Wine Doctor on the Pays Nantais A synopsis of the Muscadet region
 MelondeBourgogne.com, focused on Melon cultivation in the USA

White wine grape varieties